Andrej Karpathy (born 23 October 1986) is a Slovak-Canadian computer scientist who served as the director of artificial intelligence and Autopilot Vision at Tesla. Karpathy currently works for OpenAI. He specializes in deep learning and computer vision.

Biography
Andrej Karpathy was born in Bratislava, Czechoslovakia (now Slovakia) and moved with his family to Toronto when he was 15. He completed his Computer Science and Physics bachelor's degree at University of Toronto in 2009 and completed his master's degree at University of British Columbia in 2011, where he worked on physically-simulated figures. 

Karpathy graduated with a PhD from Stanford University in 2015 under the supervision of Fei-Fei Li, focusing on the intersection of natural language processing and computer vision, and deep learning models suited for this task. He authored and was the primary instructor of the first deep learning course at Stanford, CS 231n: Convolutional Neural Networks for Visual Recognition. This class became one of the largest at Stanford and has grown from 150 enrolled students in 2015 to 750 in 2017.

Karpathy is a founding member of the artificial intelligence research group OpenAI, where he worked from 2015 to 2017 as a research scientist. In June 2017 he became Tesla's director of artificial intelligence. Karpathy was named one of MIT Technology Review's Innovators Under 35 for the year 2020. After taking a several months-long sabbatical from Tesla, Karpathy announced he was leaving the company in July 2022. As of February 2023, he makes YouTube videos instructing how to create artificial neural networks.

In February 2023, Karpathy announced that he was returning to OpenAI.

See also
OpenAI

References

Bibliography

External links 
 
 
 

Machine learning researchers
Tesla, Inc. people
Stanford University alumni
Living people
1986 births
Slovak computer scientists
Slovak emigrants to Canada
Canadian computer scientists
Canadian people of Slovak descent
University of Toronto alumni
Scientists from Toronto
University of British Columbia alumni
People from Bratislava